"Kratt" is an Estonian ballet in four acts by Eduard Tubin. It is considered to be the first Estonian ballet. The libretto is written by Elfriede Saarik. The ballet is entirely based on folk tunes.

The premiere was on 31 March 1943 in Vanemuine Theatre. The ballet became infamous in Estonia due to the Soviet "March Bombing" of Tallinn in 1944, when the bombing started as the ballet was being performed at the Estonia Theatre, which was heavily damaged right after the theatre had been evacuated.

Tubin started to create the ballet already in 1938. 2nd version was created in 1940–1941 and 3rd version in 1960.

References

1943 ballet premieres
Estonian music
Theatre in Estonia